Putney Hill may refer to:

Places
Putney Hill, a district of Putney in southwest London, England

Ships
MV Putney Hill, a British cargo ship built in 1940 and sunk that same year
, a British cargo ship in service 1948-49